Marola can be one of several villages in Italy:

Marola in the comune of Torri di Quartesolo,  in the province of Vicenza, Veneto.
Marola in the comune of La Spezia, in Liguria.
Marola in the comune of Carpineti, in the province of Reggio Emilia, Emilia Romagna.